Valley Apparel L.L.C. is a United States brand of clothing consisting of Flight jackets and military outerwear manufactured in Knoxville, Tennessee for the United States Armed Forces. Founded in 1959 and independent since 2000, Valley specializes in military style apparel for both the consumer market and military customers in the United States Department of Defense (DoD).

History

Origins
In January, 1948 Robert Lane formed Superior Togs Corporation in New York City to manufacture flight jackets for the Department of Defense. In 1951 he moved his expanding business to a factory to Elizabeth, New Jersey. The following year the Government suspended operations for problems related to contract obligations. In response Lane reformed his company under a different name, Rolen Sportswear, and resumed production of flight jackets for the DoD.

By 1957 Lane sought to expand. This was achieved by creating a new company, Dobbs Industries, under 90% ownership of Lane's accountant, Samuel Gelber. Lane decided to locate Dobbs in Knoxville, Tennessee where they were able to lease factory space from Levi Strauss & Co. and acquire labor and supplies from the Wynn Industries Group.

Dobbs functioned as a subcontractor of Rolen Sportswear until 1959 when Robert Lane was caught bribing Government officials for contacts. Both Rolen Sportswear and Dobbs Industries were suspended from DoD contracts, their only source of revenue. In response Gelber approached the Wynn Industries Group and established his own company to continue flight jacket contracts for the U.S. military.

Creation of Valley Apparel
In 1961 John Niethammer was hired by one of the Wynn Group's subsidiaries to develop quality controls plans to meet Government standards. In 1982 he became an operating officer of the company. Following a decision in 2000 to separate the commercial and government sides of the business John purchased the main Knoxville manufacturing plants from Alpha Industries and began Valley Apparel L.L.C., aimed specifically at fulfilling DoD contracts.

Today
Valley Apparel is today a supplier of outerwear to the U.S. military, especially of Gore-Tex fabrics. Since splitting from Alpha they have fulfilled a number of military contracts.

Products
Valley Apparel produces namely:
36/P Flight jacket
45/P Flight jacket
APECS Parka and Trousers
USN Shipboard Jackets
N-3B Parka

Notes

External links
Valley Apparel Official Website

Clothing companies of the United States
United States military uniforms
Clothing manufacturers
Manufacturing companies based in Atlanta
American companies established in 1959
Clothing companies established in 1959